Mecyclothorax fosbergi is a species of ground beetle in the subfamily Psydrinae. It was described by Perrault in 1979.

References

fosbergi
Beetles described in 1979